Massac County High School is the only high school in the Massac Unit #1 school district, and one of two high schools in Massac County, Illinois. It was built in 1981 following the consolidation of the Brookport and Metropolis school districts. It currently serves over 600 students who come from the eastern portion of Massac County. The school's sports teams are known as the Patriots and Lady Patriots, for men and women respectively. Its colors are red, white, and blue.

Departments 
The high school currently consists of 9 departments and a functioning library.

 The Business Department teaches courses such as Accounting, Intro to Business, Computer Concepts, and basic Keyboarding.
 The English Department teaches four levels of English as well as AP Language & Composition. 
 The Math Department teaches Algebra, Geometry, Pre-Calculus, and Calculus.
 The Fine Arts Department includes Band, Choir, Pottery, Spanish, and German.
 The Physical Education Department has courses in Physical Education and Driver's Education.
 The Guidance Department assists students with college preparation and scholarship searches. 
 The Science Department teaches AP Chemistry, AP Biology, Physical Science, and Health Science, among others.
 The Library currently has approximately 15,000 books and subscriptions to 28 magazines. 
 The Social Studies Department teaches AP U.S. History, AP U.S. Government, Government, and World History, among others. 
 The Vocational Department introduces students to courses in Health Occupations, Welding, Agriculture Science, and many others.

Clubs & Organizations 
The high school also has many clubs and organizations in which students can get involved. They include the following:

 Biology Club
 Key Club
 National Honor Society
 Fellowship of Christian Athletes
 German Club
 Spanish Club
 Cultural Awareness Club
 Drama Club
 Marching Band

Athletics 
Massac County High School students have the opportunity to play a variety of sports, such as:

 Volleyball
 Baseball
 Softball
 Soccer
 football
 Basketball
 Golf
 Bowling
 Marching Band
 Track and field

Academics 
The graduating class of 2014 had a graduation rate within four years of 88%, which is above the state average of 86%. It is not as high as 91%, which it had been as recently as 2011, nor as low as 76%, as in 2012. Of the class of 2012, only 68% enrolled in a two or four-year college twelve months after graduation, nearly matching the state average of 69%. In 2014, 46% of students were deemed "college ready" by achieving a score of 21 on the ACT, matching the state average.

Demographics 
Unlike most of the state, the student body's racial/ethnic makeup has not changed significantly in the past five years. 
As of 2014, 84% of the student body is Caucasian, down slightly from 85% in 2011. Approximately 7% of students are African American, with another 2% reporting Hispanic ancestry, and 7% reporting two or more races.

References

http://mchs.massac.org
http://illinoisreportcard.com/District.aspx?source=Profile&Districtid=02061001026
https://sites.google.com/a/massac.org/mchs-library/

Public high schools in Illinois
Education in Massac County, Illinois